Dark Rift is a studio album by American electronic musician Pictureplane. It was released by Lovepump United Records on August 4, 2009. Music videos were created for "Trance Doll" and "Goth Star".

Critical reception

Zach Kelly of Pitchfork gave the album a 7.3 out of 10, saying, "the propulsive, strobe-streaked allegiance to the mainstream dance music of days gone by is ultimately the most admirable thing about Dark Rift." Shawn Reynaldo of XLR8R gave the album an 8.5 out of 10, saying, "Dark Rift proves that even DIY warehouse kids can make some first-rate dance music." Matthew Collins of PopMatters gave the album 8 stars out of 10, saying: "No song on Dark Rift may be especially fantastic, but no song on the album is anything less than great, either."

"Goth Star" was placed at number 79 on Pitchforks "Top 100 Tracks of 2009" list.

Track listing

Personnel
Credits adapted from liner notes.
 Pictureplane – artwork, sounds, sampling
 Josh Bonati – mastering

References

External links
 

2009 albums
Pictureplane albums
Lovepump United albums